Albania–United Kingdom relations are the bilateral relations between Albania and the United Kingdom. Albania has an embassy in London, and the United Kingdom has an embassy in Tirana. Diplomatic relations were established first in 1922, interrupted in 1939 for 51 years, to be re-established on 29 May 1991.

Both countries are members of the North Atlantic Treaty Organization (NATO) and the Organization for Security and Co-operation in Europe (OSCE).

High level visits

Cooperation 

The militaries of Albania and the United Kingdom have cooperated on numerous occasions, including military exercises in 2013 and 2014. The 2014 Albanian Lion exercise saw 600 Royal Marines visit Albania.

In 2016, around 1,500 military personnel from the United Kingdom joined Albanian forces for Exercise Albanian Lion.

Agreements

See also 
 Foreign relations of Albania
 Foreign relations of the United Kingdom
 Albanians in the United Kingdom
 Corfu Channel case
 List of ambassadors of Albania to the United Kingdom

External links 
 FCO Profile

References 

 
United Kingdom
Bilateral relations of the United Kingdom